Hilltop is a ghost town situated in Cochise County, Arizona, United States. Hilltop was discovered in the 1880s and was a successful mining town in the 1900s. Their economy declined steadily until the 1940s when Hilltop became a ghost town. The Hilltop Post office was erected on June 26, 1920, serving the local community. The most notable achievement of the town was their purchase of an automobile in 1913 which they cherished and took great care of, using it to export minerals and ores.

References

External links
 
 Hilltop – Ghost Town of the Month at azghosttowns.com

Populated places in Cochise County, Arizona
Ghost towns in Arizona